Larsa Marie Pippen (born July 6, 1974) is an American reality television personality, socialite, and businesswoman. She is an original main cast member on Bravo's reality series The Real Housewives of Miami, appearing since its premiere in 2011, rejoining in 2021. She is the ex-wife of former NBA player Scottie Pippen.

Early life and education 
Pippen was born on July 6, 1974. Her mother is from Lebanon and her father is from Syria. She was raised in Chicago, Illinois.

Career

Television 
In February 2011, The Real Housewives of Miami debuted its first season, featuring Pippen alongside Lea Black, Adriana de Moura, Alexia Nepola, Marysol Patton and Cristy Rice as they balanced their personal and professional lives, following a "work hard, play hard" lifestyle, whilst living in Miami, Florida. Pippen departed the first season after only 7 episodes, reportedly due to her being "too level-headed" for the Miami housewives cast. The show ended after its third season due to the declining ratings leading up to the reunion. After Bravo re-ran the first 3 seasons of the show in 2020, rumours circulated in November 2020 of a potential fourth season. In 2021, a fourth season was confirmed by Bravo in February, with a cast announcement made by streaming service Peacock in October, featuring Pippen alongside Lisa Hochstein and Nepola, with newcomers Guerdy Abraira, Julia Lemigova and Nicole Martin; joined by de Moura, Patton and new friend Kiki Barth. Pippen returned for the show's fifth season, which premiered in December 2022.

In addition to Pippen's housewives return, she has made frequent appearances on Keeping Up with the Kardashians over the years, notably due to her friendship with Kim Kardashian and the rest of the Kardashian-Jenner family. She appeared on the second season's fifth episode of Selling Sunset where Chrishell Stause gave her a house tour. She was also present alongside her then-husband, Scottie Pippen, as they supported their daughter Sophia on Dancing with the Stars: Juniors. Pippen has made guest appearances on talk shows including The Nick Cannon TV Series, The Wendy Williams Show and Watch What Happens Live with Andy Cohen.

Jewelry 
In August 2020, Pippen successfully launched and modeled her high-end jewelry line, Larsa Marie. She detailed that the line offers a wide variety of pieces that focus on "self-love and empowering women to feel like their best selves". In 2021, Pippen scored the cover of Harper's Bazaar Vietnam's August issue, as she debuted her latest collection, discussed her personal life in the public eye and provided fashion advice.

Personal life 
Pippen is a mother to Scotty Jr., Preston, Justin and Sophia, all of whom she shares with her ex-husband Scottie Pippen. Scottie and Larsa first split in 2016 after almost two decades of marriage but reconciled, until 2018 when they began the separation process. Their divorce was finalized on December 15, 2021, with all issues resolved amicably, continuing to focus on "co-parenting their remaining minor children".

Filmography

See also 
 The Real Housewives
 The Real Housewives of Miami

References

External links 
 

1974 births
Living people
People from Miami
University of Illinois alumni
American models
American socialites
Participants in American reality television series
American people of Assyrian descent
American people of Syrian descent
American people of Lebanese descent